Letoya Makhene (born 7 September 1984) is a South African actress, singer, traditional doctor and TV personality. She is well known for acting in South Africa's famous soap operas, Isidingo nad Generations:The Legacy and she is a daughter of an actor, singer and traditional doctor Blonde Makhene.

Career
Makhene was a host in the first season of Idols South Africa. She trained for several months to be a traditional healer but stopped her practice and went on to work in Generations the Legacy until late 2019. Her role was the notorious gangster wife of Kumkani  Phakade aka "Gadaffi". and as Tau Mogale's sister.

Music career
She has also made appearances in the music industry from the age of seven as one of Brenda Fassie's backup singers. She also has worked with DJ Cleo in their song "The One", and also worked with DJ Qness in their song "I Get Weak" and in 2016 has released solo songs and is preparing a solo debut album.
In 2016, DJ Chynaman featured Makhene in the song "Keep on Trying".

Filmography

Traditional healer
Letoya left the screen in 2003 to take an eight-month training course at an initiation school to become a sangoma but after a while she put her sangoma duties to one side until she can find a safe place for her practice.

Other media
Letoya has appeared in both issues of Bona and True Love magazine.

References

External links

Living people
1984 births